Petricolaria pholadiformis, common names false angelwing, or false angel wing (US), and American piddock (UK), is a species of saltwater clam, a marine bivalve mollusk in the family Veneridae, the Venus clams.

Description
Petricolaria pholadiformis closely resembles the angel wing (Cyrtopleura costata), the main distinguishing feature being that it lacks the apophyses, the spoon-shaped wings located near the beak, of the real angel wing. The anterior end is extended and has a rounded point while the posterior end is blunt and curved. There are ridges radiating from the beak, which are more pronounced at the posterior end, and fainter growth rings running parallel with the margin.
<div align=center>
Right and left valve of the same specimen:

</div align=center>

Taxonomy 
Petricolaria pholadiformis was formerly classified under genus Petricola as Petricola pholadiformis but has since been reclassified under genus Petricolaria.

Distribution

Indigenous
This species is native to the Eastern Coast of North America including the Gulf of Mexico.

Introduced
This clam was introduced and has become established in the British Isles and on the West Coast of North America.

References

Veneridae
Bivalves described in 1818